Wheels is the plural of wheel.

Wheels or WHEELS may also refer to:

Arts and entertainment

Music
The Wheels, a 1960s R&B and blues-influenced rock band
Wheels (Restless Heart album) (1986)
Wheels (The Road Hammers album) (2014)
Wheels (Dan Tyminski album) (2008)
Wheels, a 2006 album by Hometown News
Wheels (EP), a 2005 EP by Cake

Songs
"Wheels" (Restless Heart song), 1987
"Wheels" (The String-A-Longs song), 1960
"Wheels", a 1969 song by The Flying Burrito Brothers from their album The Gilded Palace of Sin
"Wheels", a 2004 song by Cake from their album Pressure Chief
"Wheels" (Foo Fighters song), 2009
"Wheels", a 2008 song by AC/DC from their album Black Ice
"Wheels", a song by Husker Du from Everything Falls Apart

Other
Wheels (novel), by Arthur Hailey
"Wheels" (Adventure Time), a 2017 episode of Adventure Time
"Wheels" (Glee), a television episode
Helen Wheels (Ben 10), a character on the TV series Ben 10
Wheels (film), 1998 Yugoslav film
Wheels, a fictional character of the Burger King Kids Club advertising campaign

Transportation-related
 Slang for automobile
WHEELS (California), a bus service in southeast Alameda County, California
Wheels (New Jersey Transit), a suburban bus service
WHEELS, the bus system in Norwalk, Connecticut
Wheels (magazine), an Australian automotive magazine
Wheels Magazine (Sweden), a Swedish automotive magazine
Wheels (TV series), a car and motorbike program on BBC World News India

Sports teams
Detroit Wheels (1973–1974), of the former World Football League
Detroit Wheels (soccer) (1994–1995), a former soccer team
Detroit Wheels (2004–2006), former name of the Detroit Panthers minor league basketball team
Ottawa Wheels (1997), a former Canadian roller hockey team

Other uses
Wheels (nickname), any of several people or fictional characters
Wheels (operating system), for Commodore computers
Wheels Entertainments, a company that operates transportable Ferris wheels
Wheels, another name for the Ophanim in Judeo-Christian tradition
In horology, a term for gears
Washington Heights Expeditionary Learning School

See also 
Wheel (disambiguation)